Foucault is a small lunar impact crater that lies along the southern edge of Mare Frigoris, to the southeast of the crater Harpalus. In the rugged terrain to the south of Foucault is Sharp. The outer perimeter of Foucault forms a somewhat irregular circle, with slight outward bulges to the south and northeast. The inner wall of the rim is not notably terraced, and slopes down directly to the uneven floor. It is named after physicist Léon Foucault, most famous for the Foucault pendulum.

References

 
 
 
 
 
 
 
 
 
 
 
 

Impact craters on the Moon